Lun Gongren (663 – 723) was a general of China during Tang Dynasty and Wu Zetian's Zhou Dynasty.

Lun was a Tibetan, his Tibetan name was Gar Mangpoje. After his father Gar Trinring Tsendro was purged by the young king Tridu Songtsen, he surrendered to China together with his uncle Gar Tsenba. Later, he served as a famous general of China.

References
New Book of Tang, vol. 123

663 births
723 deaths
7th-century Tibetan people
People of the Tibetan Empire
Tang dynasty generals at war against Tibet
Tang dynasty nonimperial princes